The 1979 Swiss Championships was a men's tennis tournament played on outdoor clay courts in Gstaad, Switzerland. It was the 34th edition of the tournament and was held from 9 July until 15 July 1979. The tournament was part of the 1979 Grand Prix tennis circuit and offered total prize money of $75,000. Third-seeded Ulrich Pinner won the singles title.

Finals

Singles
 Ulrich Pinner defeated  Peter McNamara 6–2, 6–4, 7–5
 It was Pinner's 1st singles title of the year and the 2nd of his career.

Doubles
 Mark Edmondson /  John Marks defeated  Ion Ţiriac /  Guillermo Vilas 2–6, 6–1, 6–4

References

External links
 Official website
 ATP tournament profile
 ITF tournament edition details

Swiss Open (tennis)
Swiss Open Gstaad
1979 Grand Prix (tennis)